Home is a 2015 American computer-animated science fiction comedy film produced by DreamWorks Animation and distributed by 20th Century Fox. Loosely based on Adam Rex's 2007 children's book The True Meaning of Smekday, the film was directed by Tim Johnson from a screenplay by Tom J. Astle and Matt Ember, and stars the voices of Jim Parsons, Rihanna, Steve Martin, Jennifer Lopez, and Matt Jones. The story follows the shared adventures of a friendly alien who is shunned by the rest of his kind, and a teenage girl searching for her mother after they are separated during an invasion of Earth.

The film premiered at the Boulder International Film Festival on March 7, 2015, and was released in theaters on March 27, 2015. Home was promoted with the release of a four-minute short film titled Almost Home, which was shown in theaters before DreamWorks Animation's Mr. Peabody & Sherman and Blue Sky Studios' Rio 2 in 2014. Rihanna created a concept album of the same name. The soundtrack also includes guest vocals from Jennifer Lopez, among others, and was supported by two singles, "Towards the Sun" and "Feel the Light". Home received mixed reviews from critics and grossed $386 million worldwide.

A traditionally animated Netflix original series was released on July 29, 2016, with the elements of its plot taking place after the events of the film. With the exception of Matt Jones, none of the original cast reprised their roles for the series.

Plot

A cowardly alien race known as the Boov, led by Captain Smek, commence their "friendly" invasion of the planet Earth. Relocating the humans, whom the Boov deem as simple and backwards, to the Australian Outback, the Boov inhabit their homes. Oh, an accident-prone, free-thinking Boov, decides to invite the other Boov to his apartment for a housewarming party, but no one comes. Meanwhile, 12-year-old Gratuity "Tip" Tucci and her Japanese Bobtail cat Pig drive around the city searching for Tip's mom Lucy, who was taken during the invasion.

Oh visits grumpy Boov traffic officer Kyle, to invite him to the party. However, Oh accidentally sends the invitation email to every alien race in the galaxy, including the hostile Gorg, who have been the Boov's longtime enemy ever since a failed peace meeting, during which Captain Smek stole an artifact he later dubbed "the Shusher". Furious with Oh for revealing their new home to the Gorg, the Boov declare him a fugitive. Oh runs into a convenience store to hide, just as Tip crashes the car and enters the store in search of supplies. Tip attacks Oh on sight, and locks him in a freezer, until he promises to fix her car. He turns it into a flying craft named "Slushious".

To hide from the Boov, Oh promises to help Tip find Lucy. However, Oh secretly plans to abandon Tip and take himself to Antarctica, the only place on Earth with no Boov. His attempt to leave Tip in a public restroom 
is thwarted by Kyle, who arrives to force Oh to give him his email password so Smek can cancel the invitation.

Escaping Kyle, Oh and Tip reach Paris and sneak into the Boov Command Centre. Oh cancels the invite before it reaches the Gorg; he then looks for Lucy, and the computer confirms she is in Australia. Trying to return to Slushious, Oh and Tip are cornered by Smek and many other Boov at the Great Antenna (Eiffel Tower). Smek orders Oh's execution, despite the invitation being stopped. Tip uses a Boov gravity device to turn the tower upside down, and she and Oh escape.

Oh informs Tip that he now believes Smek's propaganda about humans being simple and backward is wrong, and apologizes to her. They fly to Australia, but are suddenly surrounded by hundreds of Boov fleeing from Gorg drones, sent to search for them. Slushious is wrecked, but Oh finds a Gorg SuperChip in a crashed drone, and uses it to repair the car.

When they reach the human relocation camp, Oh realizes the other Boov are evacuating, and fears that the Gorg will take vengeance on Earth when they cannot find the Boov. He tries to convince Tip to flee with them, but she refuses. Oh joins the Boov, but runs back towards the Gorg to use the SuperChip to power the Boov mothership, which then easily outpaces the Gorg. Impressed at his bravery, the other Boov listen as Oh berates Captain Smek for his lies, and the other Boov for their cowardice. Moved, Kyle takes the Shusher from a horrified Smek and decrees that Oh should be the new captain. Oh reluctantly accepts, turns the ship around, and returns to Earth. He helps Tip reunite with Lucy, fulfilling his promise.

Realizing from a chance remark of Tip's that the Gorg are actually chasing the Shusher and not the Boov, Oh locks Tip and Lucy inside Slushious, and faces the approaching Gorg ship alone. Tip and Lucy escape and try to stop him. The Gorg ship hits the brakes, only just avoiding crushing Oh. He returns the Shusher, revealed to be an egg containing the entire next generation of Gorg. The lone Gorg inside the ship happily accepts the egg; being the last of his kind, he had been desperately searching for his children.

After the Gorg leave, the Boov relocate their colony to the moon. Many Boov visit Earth and mingle with the humans, who are restored to their original homes. Oh moves in with Tip and Lucy; many other aliens, invited by Oh, come to visit earth and attend his parties.

Voice cast
 Jim Parsons as Oh, a Boov fugitive.
 Rihanna as Gratuity "Tip" Tucci, a 12 year old girl who befriends Oh.
 Steve Martin as Captain Smek, the leader of the Boov race.
 Jennifer Lopez as Lucy Tucci, Tip's mother.
 Matt Jones as Kyle, a Boov police officer.
 Brian Stepanek as the Gorg Commander, the leader and father of the Gorg races.
 Stepanek also voices some Boov.
 Frank Welker as Pig, Tip's pet Japanese Bobtail (Uncredited)
Additionally, April Lawrence and Nigel W. Tierney voice Boov Announcer and Child A respectively.

Production

In 2008, DreamWorks Animation optioned the book's rights to adapt it into an animated feature film. On his blog, Adam Rex announced that DreamWorks renewed the option of the adaptation in 2011. On June 20, 2012, it was revealed that the title of the film would be Happy Smekday!, Jim Parsons and Rihanna would star in the lead roles, and the film would be released in the fourth quarter of 2014. In September 2012, 20th Century Fox and DreamWorks Animation announced a release date of November 26, 2014. In June 2013, the film was retitled from Happy Smekday! to Home.

On October 3, 2013, it was announced that Steve Martin and Jennifer Lopez had joined the cast. On May 20, 2014, the film's release date was pushed back to March 27, 2015, switching places with DreamWorks Animation's film Penguins of Madagascar. Jeffrey Katzenberg, DreamWorks Animation's CEO, reasoned that Penguins, coming from one of DWA's most successful franchises, would more easily stand out during Thanksgiving time, while Home would try to take advantage of the less competitive spring release window, and repeat successful spring launches of some of DWA's original films, including The Croods and How to Train Your Dragon.

Soundtrack

In addition to her voice role, Rihanna created a concept album for the film (also titled Home) which was released on March 13, 2015. It consists of 8 original songs. The soundtrack's lead single, Rihanna's "Towards the Sun", premiered on BBC Radio 1 on February 9, 2015, and was made available for digital download the same day, via the iTunes Store. The second single, "Feel the Light", recorded by Jennifer Lopez, was released on February 25, 2015, via the iTunes Store.

Release
A 4-minute short film called Almost Home was attached to theatrical showings of DreamWorks Animation's Mr. Peabody & Sherman in early 2014 and Blue Sky Studios' Rio 2 that same year. It was directed by Todd Wilderman, and features a score composed by Lorne Balfe. The short shows the Boov and Captain Smek in a sequence of unsuccessful attempts at finding a hospitable planet, before they finally come across the Earth. The film itself premiered at the Boulder International Film Festival on March 7, 2015.

Home media
Home was released digitally on June 26, 2015, and was released on DVD, Blu-ray and Blu-ray 3D on July 28, 2015. In the United Kingdom, Home went to number one on the Official Video Chart in its first week of sale.

Reception

Box office
Home grossed $177.4 million in North America and has grossed $208.6 million in other territories for a worldwide total of $386 million. Its production cost was $135 million, with a similar sum spent for prints and advertising (P&A). Deadline Hollywood calculated the net profit of the film to be $29.12 million, when factoring together all expenses and revenues for the film.

Home opened in the U.S. and Canada simultaneously with the comedy Get Hard on March 27, 2015. Though the latter earned higher in its Thursday late-night run, estimates were showing that Home was heading to No. 1 in its opening weekend. It scored one of the biggest opening days for a DreamWorks Animation non-sequel ever with $15.6 million, behind Kung Fu Panda ($20 million) and Monsters vs. Aliens ($16.75 million). Home debuted at the top of the box office, with $52.1 million, which exceeded predictions of a $30 million to $35 million opening and was also DreamWorks Animation's best opening since the $60.3 million debut of Madagascar 3: Europe's Most Wanted.

Outside North America, Home was released in 10 countries on March 20, 2015, a week ahead of its U.S. premiere. It earned $20.1 million, coming in third place at the international box office behind Cinderella and The Divergent Series: Insurgent. The following weekend, it expanded to 55 additional countries and grossed a total of $24 million from 11,250 screens in 64 countries. Its largest openings occurred in the UK, Ireland and Malta ($9.12 million), Russia ($5.17 million), Mexico ($3 million), Brazil ($2.3 million), Australia ($2.42 million), and Spain ($2.24 million).

Critical response
The website's consensus reads, "Colorful, silly, and utterly benign, Home is a passable diversion, but there's no shortage of superior animated alternatives." On Metacritic, which assigns a weighted average rating, the film has a score of 55 out of 100, based on 31 critics, indicating "mixed or average reviews". In CinemaScore polls conducted during the opening weekend, cinema audiences gave Home an average grade of "A" on an A+ to F scale.

Michael Rechtshaffen of The Hollywood Reporter said, "There may be no place like home, but there are a lot of places like Home, an animated adventure about the unlikely friendship between a lonely girl and an alien misfit that can't help but feel familiar." James Rocchi of The Wrap gave the film a positive review, saying "As animated sci-fi for small fry, it's a success whose modest but well-executed ambitions are no small part of its charm." Stephen Whitty gave the film two out of five stars, saying "The Gummi-colored animation is imaginative, but director Tim Johnson's ho-hum 3D cartoon remains strictly 1D." Rafer Guzman of Newsday gave the film two out of four stars, saying "The film moves quickly and keeps the jokes coming, which only means that Home would rather keep young viewers occupied than give them something to think about." Ben Sachs of the Chicago Reader gave the film a negative review, saying "Aggressive and cynical approach to children's entertainment, pummeling viewers with mechanical-looking action sequences (which suggest video game demos), unfunny one-liners, and overly loud pop songs and sound effects." Claudia Puig of USA Today gave the film two out of five stars, saying "Key characters are admirably diverse, but the fast-paced tale is thoroughly predictable."

Soren Anderson of The Seattle Times gave the film two and a half stars out of four, saying "It works moderately well thanks largely to the voice talents of Jim Parsons and, to a lesser extent, Steve Martin. Two droll dudes who put a fair share of funny into this animated picture." Neil Genzlinger of The New York Times called the film "A charming concoction with positive messages for younger children about conquering fears, understanding outsiders and knowing yourself." Betsy Sharkey of the Los Angeles Times gave the film a negative review, saying "Tension is one of Home's biggest issues. There just isn't nearly enough of it. Story is another. Even a kids' movie needs more complexity and more invention." Linda Barnard of the Toronto Star gave the film two and a half stars out of four, saying "Aside from Parsons' initially amusingly mangled Yoda-like English, which gets a tad repetitive, Home doesn't stand out as fresh or particularly funny." Dana Rose Falcone of Entertainment Weekly gave the film an A−, saying "The combination of Home'''s layered message, fun score, and clever comedy make it a colorful choice for moviegoers of any age." Stephanie Zacharek of The Village Voice gave the film a mixed review, saying "If director Tim Johnson -- adapting Adam Rex's book The True Meaning of Smekday -- can't do much with the story's confused, if well-intentioned, agenda, at least he's got some charming, vivid characters to work with." Richard Roeper of the Chicago Sun-Times gave the film a C, saying "Anyone over 10 will see the plot twists a mile away. Kids will probably enjoy the goofy Boovs, the rainbows of colors and the music. Call me a traditionalist, but I still say the world was a better place before those darn Boovs invaded."

Peter Debruge of Variety gave the film a negative review, saying "From a creative standpoint, this is the studio's least exciting feature yet - hardly its worst, execution-wise, but entirely lacking in the risk-taking spirit that has spawned such successful franchises as Shrek, Kung Fu Panda and Dragon."  Barbara VanDenburgh of The Arizona Republic gave the film two out of five stars, saying "For all its energy, razzle-dazzle and whiz-bang technology, it doesn't know how to tell a simple story or cobble together three-dimensional characters, and that's a problem not even the best of 3-D glasses can fix." Susan Wloszczyna of RogerEbert.com gave the film two out of four stars, saying "I kept thinking about Lilo & Stitch while watching Home, a decidedly disappointing effort based on the popular kid-lit book The True Meaning of Smekday from the already embattled folks at DreamWorks Animation."

Accolades

Television series
An animated series titled Home: Adventures with Tip & Oh was released on Netflix on July 29, 2016. Jim Parsons and Rihanna do not reprise their roles as Oh and Tip. They are instead voiced by Mark Whitten and Rachel Crow respectively, although Matt Jones reprises his role of Kyle from the film. It was developed by Thurop Van Orman and Ryan Crego.

See also
 List of animated feature films of 2015
 The True Meaning of Smekday'', the book that the film is based on.

References

External links

  at DreamWorks Animation
 
 
 
 
 

2015 films
2015 3D films
2015 comedy films
2015 science fiction films
2015 computer-animated films
2010s American animated films
2010s science fiction comedy films
2010s English-language films
American 3D films
American computer-animated films
American children's animated comic science fiction films
American buddy comedy films
Animated buddy films
3D animated films
Animated films based on children's books
Animated films based on American novels
Films based on science fiction novels
Films adapted into television shows
Animated films about extraterrestrial life
Films about mother–daughter relationships
Animated films about cats
Animated films about friendship
Animated films set in New York City
Animated films set in Paris
Films set in Australia
Animated films set in the future
Films directed by Tim Johnson
Films scored by Lorne Balfe
20th Century Fox films
20th Century Fox animated films
DreamWorks Animation animated films